István Tukacs (born 10 July 1958) is a Hungarian politician, member of the National Assembly (MP) for Nyíregyháza (Szabolcs-Szatmár-Bereg County Constituency II) from 2006 to 2010. He was also a Member of Parliament from the national list of the Hungarian Socialist Party (MSZP) between 2010 and 2018; he was also a founding member of the party.

References

1958 births
Living people
Hungarian Socialist Party politicians
Members of the National Assembly of Hungary (2006–2010)
Members of the National Assembly of Hungary (2010–2014)
Members of the National Assembly of Hungary (2014–2018)
People from Nyíregyháza